The Montreux Music & Convention Centre (formerly and still commonly known as the Montreux Convention Centre)  is a multi-purpose complex located in Montreux, Switzerland. It hosts the annual Montreux Jazz Festival. The convention center's main venues are the 4,000-capacity Auditorium Stravinski and the 2,000-capacity Miles Davis Hall. The facility opened in 1973 and received its current name in 2006.

References

External links
 Official website

Convention centres in Switzerland
Music venues in Switzerland